Miyombweni is an administrative ward in the Mbarali District of the Mbeya Region of Tanzania. In 2016 the Tanzania National Bureau of Statistics report there were 10,771 people in the ward, from 9,773 in 2012.

Villages and hamlets 
The ward has 5 villages, and 19 hamlets.

 Magigiwe
 Magigiwe 'A'
 Magigiwe 'B'
 Mkindi 'A'
 Mkindi 'B'
 Mnyelela
 Mapogoro
 Igubike
 Ikulu 'A'
 Ikulu 'B'
 Mapogoro 'A'
 Mapogoro 'B'
 Mlungu
 Masangala
 Mawe saba
 Mlungu
 Myombweni
 Azimio
 Kichangani
 Mabatini
 Nyakazombe
 Kinyangulu
 Nyakazombe
 Nyakazombe kati

References 

Wards of Mbeya Region